Ace in the Hole may refer to:

Music
 Ace in the Hole Band, the backup band for George Strait
 "Ace in the Hole" (Cole Porter song)
 "Ace in the Hole" (George Strait song) written by Dennis Adkins
 "Ace in the Hole", a song by Paul Simon on the album One-Trick Pony
 "Ace in the Hole", song composed in 1909 by James Dempsey and George Mitchell;  recorded by Bunk Johnson, Turk Murphy, Bobby Darin & Johnny Mercer, Dave Van Ronk, and others.

Other uses
 Ace in the Hole (1942 film), an animated cartoon short subject
 Ace in the Hole (1951 film), a film starring Kirk Douglas
 Ace in the Hole (anthology), edited by George R. R. Martin
 Ace in the Hole, a 2009 sitcom pilot starring Adam Carolla
 Having an ace as a hole card in poker
 That Old Ace in the Hole, a 2002 novel by Annie Proulx